The 1998–99 Welsh Alliance League was the 15th season of the Welsh Alliance League after its establishment in 1984. The league was won by Llangefni Town.

League table

References

External links
Welsh Alliance League

Welsh Alliance League seasons
3
Wales